Rajendranath Sanyal (born 24 May 1935) is an Indian former cricketer. He played first-class cricket for Bengal, Jharkhand and Railways.

References

External links
 

1935 births
Living people
Indian cricketers
Bengal cricketers
Jharkhand cricketers
Railways cricketers
People from Ranchi
Cricketers from Jharkhand